Stanley J. Brodsky (born January 9, 1940) is an American theoretical physicist and Emeritus professor in the SLAC Theory Group at the SLAC National Accelerator Laboratory at Stanford University.

Biography

Brodsky obtained an undergraduate degree in 1961 and Ph.D. in physics in 1964 from the University of Minnesota, where his advisor was Donald R. Yennie.  After two years as a research associate for Tsung-Dao Lee at Columbia University, in 1966 he began working for SLAC, where he became a professor in 1976.

Brodsky's research has focused on quantum chromodynamics, which is the theory describing the strong interactions between quarks and gluons.  His 1973 paper co-authored with Glennys Farrar, Scaling Laws at Large Transverse Momentum (Phys. Rev. Lett. 31, 1153–1156), and 1980 paper with Peter Lepage, Exclusive Processes in Perturbative Quantum Chromodynamics (Phys. Rev. D 22, 2157–2198), led to the award of the Sakurai Prize.

He was the 2007 recipient of the Sakurai Prize for Theoretical Particle Physics, "for applications of perturbative quantum field theory to critical questions of elementary particle physics, in particular, to the analysis of hard exclusive strong interaction processes."  He received the Pomeranchuk Prize, an international award for theoretical physics in 2015.

See also
Light front holography
Light-front computational methods

References

External
 Stanley Brodsky personal page at SLAC
 Oral history interview transcript for Stanley Brodsky on 22 April 2021, American Institute of Physics, Niels Bohr Library & Archives

21st-century American physicists
1940 births
Living people
Theoretical physicists
University of Minnesota College of Science and Engineering alumni
J. J. Sakurai Prize for Theoretical Particle Physics recipients